Geghadir or Gekhadir may refer to:
Geghadir, Aragatsotn, Armenia
Geghadir, Kotayk, Armenia
Geghadir, Shirak, Armenia